

England

Head coach: Peter Colston

 Bill Beaumont (c.)
 Mike Burton
 David Caplan
 Maurice Colclough
 Barry Corless
 Fran Cotton
 Robin Cowling
 Peter Dixon
 Paul Dodge
 Dusty Hare
 Alastair Hignell
 Nigel Horton
 Charles Kent
 Andy Maxwell
 Bob Mordell
 Tony Neary
 Barry Nelmes
 Alan Old
 Mike Rafter
 John Scott
 Mike Slemen
 Peter Squires
 Peter Wheeler
 Malcolm Young

France

Head coach: Jean Desclaux

 Jean-Michel Aguirre
 Jean-Luc Averous
 Jean-Pierre Bastiat (c.)
 Christian Belascain
 Roland Bertranne
 Louis Bilbao
 Daniel Bustaffa
 Gérard Cholley
 Jérôme Gallion
 Jean-François Gourdon
 Francis Haget
 Jean-François Imberbon
 Guy Noves
 Alain Paco
 Michel Palmie
 Robert Paparemborde
 Jean-Pierre Rives
 Jean-Claude Skrela
 Bernard Vivies

Ireland

Head coach: Noel Murphy

 Ned Byrne
 Willie Duggan
 Anthony Ensor
 Mick Fitzpatrick
 Mike Gibson
 Tom Grace
 Moss Keane
 Alistair McKibbin
 Stewart McKinney
 Freddie McLennan
 Paul McNaughton
 John Moloney (c.)
 Lawrence Moloney
 John O'Driscoll
 Phil Orr
 Fergus Slattery
 Donal Spring
 Harold Steele
 Tony Ward
 Pa Whelan

Scotland

Head coach: Nairn McEwan

 Mike Biggar
 Richard Breakey
 Sandy Carmichael
 Alastair Cranston
 Colin Deans
 Bill Gammell
 David Gray
 Bruce Hay
 Brian Hegarty
 Graham Hogg
 Andy Irvine
 Don Macdonald
 George Mackie
 Duncan Madsen
 Ian McGeechan
 Alastair McHarg
 Ian McLauchlan
 Doug Morgan (c.)
 Norman Pender
 Jim Renwick
 David Shedden
 Alan Tomes
 Ron Wilson

Wales

Head coach: John Dawes

 Phil Bennett (c.)
 Terry Cobner
 Gerald Davies
 Gareth Edwards
 Charlie Faulkner
 Steve Fenwick
 Ray Gravell
 Allan Martin
 Graham Price
 Derek Quinnell
 Jeff Squire
 Geoff Wheel
 J. J. Williams
 J. P. R. Williams
 Bobby Windsor

 Wales used the same 15 players during the competition

External links
1978 Five Nations Championship at ESPN

Six Nations Championship squads